Christopher Frederick Currant,  (14 December 1911 – 12 March 2006), nicknamed "Bunny", was a Royal Air Force fighter pilot and flying ace of the Second World War.

Early life and career
Currant was born on 14 December 1911 in Luton, Bedfordshire. Aged 25 he joined the Royal Air Force in 1936; after qualifying as a pilot he joined No. 46 Squadron as a sergeant pilot and later with No. 151 Squadron; he was later commissioned as a pilot officer and began service with No. 605 squadron at RAF Wick, Caithness on the Wick Bay.

Second World War
In the second week of the Battle of France in May 1940, his squadron was moved down to RAF Hawkinge in Kent; from here the squadron flew sorties in France where enemy aircraft were attacking the retreating British Expeditionary Force. On one early sortie the engine on his Hawker Hurricane failed, forcing him to crash land in a field, breaking his nose and he was forced to make his own way to Calais where he managed to get a lift on board a vessel back to England.

605 squadron was then moved to RAF Drem where it took part in the interception of the famous Luftflotte 5 raid which took place on 15 August. Currant claimed two Heinkel He 111s shot down. The squadron was again moved south again – this time to RAF Croydon and was soon in the midst of the heaviest fighting in September 1940.

Currant's tally of enemy aircraft rose steadily and on 15 September alone, he had accounted for 2 Dornier Do 17s, a Messerschmitt Bf 109 and damaged another three Do 17s as well as a Heinkel He 111. By the end of 1940 his tally stood at 8 destroyed and 5 shared, and he was awarded the Distinguished Flying Cross on 8 October 1940 and the Bar to it in the consecutive month.

Currant then had a spell as the chief flying instructor of No. 52 Operational Training Unit (OTU) at Debden; this was followed by the command of 501 Squadron (Spitfires) in August 1941. It was at this time that he played himself in the film The First of the Few, which starred David Niven.

He commanded the Spitfires of the Ibsley Wing from June until August 1942, taking command from Ian Gleed who was being rested from operations. It was at this time that he was also awarded the DSO. At this time he was mainly involved in operations over occupied France and the Low Countries. He was allowed a break from fighting and undertook a four-month lecturing tour in Eastern America and upon his return he went to 84 Group Control Centre, where he was involved in the allocation of targets in support of tactical air operations. In February 1943 Currant was given the command of 122 Wing of the 2nd Tactical Air Force; he remained there until July 1944 and during this posting he was awarded the Croix de Guerre (Belgian) on 9 April 1943.

Post war
Currant chose to remain in the RAF after the war and had post-war postings in Washington DC where he was on the staff of the Joint Chiefs of Staff and this was followed by a year back in London at the Ministry of Supply. This was followed by a four-year posting to the Royal Norwegian Air Force Staff College – where the Norwegians awarded him the Royal Norwegian Order of St Olav. He retired from the RAF in 1959 whereafter he joined an engineering firm in Luton – his employers developed weapons for the RAF. He finally retired in 1974.

Currant was married to Cynthia in 1942 and they had three sons and a daughter.

Honours and awards
 8 October 1940 – Distinguished Flying Cross – Acting Flight Lieutenant Christopher Frederick Currant (43367).
 15 November 1940 – Bar to the Distinguished Flying Cross – Acting Flight Lieutenant Christopher Frederick Currant, D.F.C. (43367), No. 605 Squadron. 
 7 July 1942 – Distinguished Service Order – Acting Squadron Leader Christopher Frederick Currant, D.F.C. (43367), No.501 Squadron. 
 9 April 1943 – Croix de Guerre Belge – Conferred by the Belgian government to Acting Wing Commander Christopher Frederick Currant, D.S.O., D.F.C. (43367).
 14 January 1944 – Mentioned in Despatches by Air Officers Commanding-in-Chief – Wing Commander C.F. Currant, D.S.O., D.F.C. (43367) (Acting).
 1 January 1945 – Mentioned in Despatches by Air Officers Commanding-in-Chief – Wing Commander C.F. Currant, D.S.O., D.F.C. (43367) (Acting).
 30 September 1960 – Royal Norwegian Order of St. Olav

References

Bibliography

 Piper, Ian. We Never Slept: the Story of 605 County of Warwick Squadron, Royal Auxiliary Air Force, 1926–1957. Kingsbury, Tamworth, Staffordshire, UK: Ian Piper, 1996 (reprinted in 1997). .
 Watkins, David and Phil Listeman. No. 501 (County of Gloucester) Squadron, 1939–1945: Hurricane, Spitfire, Tempest. France: Phil Listemann Publisher, 2007. .
 Obituary – The Times 10 April 2006.

1911 births
2006 deaths
Military personnel from Bedfordshire
The Few
People from Luton
Royal Air Force wing commanders
Companions of the Distinguished Service Order
Recipients of the Croix de guerre (Belgium)
Recipients of the Distinguished Flying Cross (United Kingdom)
British World War II flying aces
Royal Air Force pilots of World War II
Wing leaders